Machhapuchchhre is a Gaunpalika and former village development committee in Kaski District in the Gandaki Province of northern-central Nepal. At the time of the 1991 Nepal census it had a population of 1,881 persons living in 378 individual households.

Demographics
At the time of the 2011 Nepal census, Machhapuchchhre Rural Municipality had a population of 21,920. Of these, 82.0% spoke Nepali, 12.4% Gurung, 4.5% Tamang, 0.5% Magar, 0.4% Newar, 0.1% Rai and 0.3% other languages as their first language.

In terms of ethnicity/caste, 30.2% were Hill Brahmin, 14.7% Gurung, 12.5% Kami, 8.0% Magar, 7.7% Chhetri, 7.3% Sarki, 6.5% Tamang, 5.9% Damai/Dholi, 2.2% other Dalit, 1.3% Thakuri, 1.1% Newar, 0.9% Gharti/Bhujel, 0.5% Sanyasi/Dasnami, 0.2% Badi, 0.2% Rai, 0.1% Musalman, 0.1% Tharu and 0.3% others.

In terms of religion, 83.9% were Hindu, 14.1% Buddhist, 1.1% Christian, 0.3% Bon,, 0.1% Kirati, 0.1% Muslim and 0.4% others.

In terms of literacy, 69.7% could both read and write, 2.3% could read but not write and 28.0% could neither read nor write.

References

External links
UN map of the municipalities of Kaski District

Populated places in Kaski District
Rural municipalities of Nepal established in 2017
Rural municipalities in Kaski District